The Voice of Finland (season 6) is the sixth season of the Finnish reality singing competition based on The Voice format. The season premiered on Nelonen on January 6, 2017. The live final is scheduled on April 14, 2017.

The coaches are singers Anna Puu, Olli Lindholm, Redrama and Michael Monroe. Heikki Paasonen hosts the program.

Teams 
Color Key

Episodes

The Blind Auditions

Episode 1: January 6, 2017

Episode 2: January 12, 2017

Episode 3: January 13, 2017

Episode 4: January 19, 2017

Episode 5: January 20, 2017

Episode 6: January 26, 2017

Episode 7: January 27, 2017

Episode 8: February 2, 2017

Episode 9: February 3, 2017

Episode 10: February 9, 2017

Episode 11: February 10, 2017

Episode 12: February 16, 2017

Battle rounds
During battle rounds, coaches divide contestants to pairs and give them a song to perform. Coach then choose a winner to continue to the Knock Out phase. The losing contestant can still be stolen by another coach, as each coach can make two steals. Each coach is also joined by an adviser, with Michael Monroe being joined by singer Robin, Olli Lindholm by singer Ellinoora, Anna Puu by singer Pete Parkkonen, and Redrama by singer Diandra.

Colour key

Episode 13: February 17, 2017

Episode 14: February 23, 2017

Episode 15: February 24, 2017

Episode 16: March 2, 2017

Knockout rounds
The Knockout rounds were aired on 3, 9, 10, and 17 of March, 2017. Teams of 8 (Anna Puu and Redrama) and 9 (Michael Monroe and Olli Lindholm) were stripped down to 4 for the live shows. The knockout takes place in a form of four-chair challenge where after each performance the coach decides on giving a chair numbered from 1 (the best performance of the night) to 4 (the last place to qualify to the live finals) or eliminates the contestant immediately. When the chairs are full and the coach decides to give a numbered chair to another contestant, the contestant on the 4th chair is eliminated and other contestants change seats to adjust to the latest number.

Colour key

Episode 17: March 3, 2017

Episode 18: March 9, 2017

Episode 19: March 10, 2017

Episode 20: March 17, 2017

Live shows
Live shows began on March 25. The live shows were aired on Friday at 8 PM from Logomo, Turku. 
Colour key

Live 1 March 24, 2017
The first live show featured a group performance by the coaches, singing each other's popular songs: "Kickstart" (Redrama), "Minne tuulet vie" (Olli Lindholm), "Säännöt rakkaudelle" (Anna Puu), "Don't You Ever Leave Me" (Hanoi Rocks/Michael Monroe).

Live 2 March 31, 2017
The show featured guest performances from Haloo Helsinki ("Oh no Let's Go") and The Rasmus ("Paradise").

Semifinal (April 7)
The show was opened by Jenni Vartiainen with her single, "Turvasana". Also Michael Monroe Band performed, with their new single ("One Foot Outta the Grave"). 

Competition performances

Semifinal results

Final (April 14)
The guest performers of the final live show were Antti Tuisku ("Rahan takii") and Happoradio ("Älä puhu huomisesta").
Competition performances
Each finalist performs a cover song and a duet with their team coach. 

Final results

 – Winner
 – Runner-up
 – 3rd/4th place

Elimination Chart

Overall

Color key
Artist's info

Result details

Reception and TV ratings
The Voice of Finland airs twice a week, on Thursday and Friday evenings at 8:00 pm. Only the higher rating for the week is given.

Notes
Rating is the average number of viewers during the program.
The latest weekly ratings contain timeshift viewing only during the same day. Older weekly ratings contain timeshift viewing during seven days.

References

External links
The Voice of Finland Official website

6
2017 Finnish television seasons